Mateus Pasinato (born 28 June 1992) is a Brazilian professional footballer who plays as a goalkeeper for América Mineiro.

Career statistics

Honours 
XV de Piracicaba
 Copa Paulista: 2016

References

External links 
 Mateus Pasinato at xvpiracicaba.com
 

1992 births
Sportspeople from Santa Catarina (state)
Living people
Brazilian footballers
Association football goalkeepers
Desportivo Brasil players
Rio Preto Esporte Clube players
Rio Branco Esporte Clube players
Esporte Clube XV de Novembro (Piracicaba) players
Vila Nova Futebol Clube players
Esporte Clube São Bento players
Moreirense F.C. players
Campeonato Brasileiro Série B players
Campeonato Brasileiro Série D players
Primeira Liga players
Brazilian expatriate footballers
Expatriate footballers in Portugal
Brazilian expatriates in Portugal
Clube Atlético Bragantino players
América Futebol Clube (MG) players